Gulia may refer to:

 Gulia clan, a Jat clan of India
 Dmitry Gulia (1874–1960), Abkhazian Soviet writer and poet
 Gavino Gulia (1835–1889), Maltese botanist
 Gulia, a village in Tărtășești Commune in Romania
 Gulia, a village in the town of Dolhasca in Romania

See also 
 Gulia Tutberidze Stadium, a stadium in Zugdidi, Georgia
 Guliya, a village in Bulgaria
 Giulia (disambiguation), an Italian name (including a list of people with the name)